"Holes" is the fourth single from Mercury Rev's fourth studio album, Deserter's Songs. The single was released in Australia only as a limited edition tour EP on July 7, 1999, although promotional CD singles were distributed to UK radio stations in 2006 (to coincide with the release of the Mercury Rev collection The Essential Mercury Rev: Stillness Breathes 1991-2006). The tour single included a live cover of "Caroline Says Pt. II" (Lou Reed) and featured Robert Creeley reading his poem "I Dreamt" over a Mercury Rev soundtrack.

PopMatters rated the song 60 in its list of 100 greatest alternative singles of the 1990s. The song has been described as a "crowd-pleaser".

Track listing
Australian tour single:
 "Holes" (Edit) - 4:10
 "Car Wash Hair" (Live) - 7:55
 "I Dreamt" - 1:30
 "Caroline Says Pt. II" (Live) - 3:33

2006 promo single:
 "Seagull" (unreleased outtake from The Secret Migration) - 3:07
 "Holes" - 5:55

References

1999 singles
Mercury Rev songs
1998 songs
V2 Records singles